The Roman Catholic Diocese of Dibrugarh is a diocese located in the city of Dibrugarh in the Ecclesiastical province of Guwahati in India.

History
 12 July 1951: Established as Diocese of Dibrugarh from the Diocese of Shillong

Leadership
 Bishops of Dibrugarh (Latin Rite)
 Bishop Albert Hemrom (15 February 2021 – present)
 Bishop Joseph Aind, S.D.B. (11 November 1994 – 15 February 2021)
 Bishop Thomas Menamparampil, S.D.B. (later Archbishop) (19 June 1981 – 30 March 1992)
 Bishop Robert Kerketta, S.D.B. (21 May 1970 – 24 October 1980)
 Archbishop Hubert D’Rosario, S.D.B. (Apostolic Administrator 26 June 1969 – 21 May 1970)
 Bishop Hubert D’Rosario, S.D.B. (later Archbishop) (6 July 1964 – 26 June 1969)
 Bishop Oreste Marengo, S.D.B. (12 July 1951 – 6 July 1964)

Schools

References

External links
 GCatholic.org 
 Catholic Hierarchy 
  Diocese website  

Roman Catholic dioceses in India
Christian organizations established in 1951
Roman Catholic dioceses and prelatures established in the 20th century
1951 establishments in Assam
Christianity in Assam
Dibrugarh